Aristotelis Thanos (born 7 April 2001) is a Greek tennis player.

Thanos has a career high ATP singles ranking of 1074 achieved on 13 December 2021. He also has a career high ATP doubles ranking of 722 achieved on 4 October 2021.

Thanos made his ATP main draw debut at the 2022 ATP Cup as one of the five members of the Greek team.

References

External links

2001 births
Living people
Greek male tennis players
Sportspeople from Athens